Two Men in Town ( a.k.a. Two Against the Law) is a 1973 Franco-Italian film directed by José Giovanni.

The film was remade in 2014.

Synopsis
Germain Cazeneuve left the police to work as a prison trainer, teaching inmates how to live once out of jail and how to stay out. He stands guarantor when Gino Strabliggi, a printer by trade, is paroled two years before his twelve-year sentence for bank robbery expires.

Germain and his family offer friendship to Gino and his wife Sophie, who has waited faithfully for ten years, until two criminals racing along a country road kill Sophie by accident.

Gino gets a steady job as a printer and meets Lucy, a bank employee, who moves into his flat.

On a regular visit to the police station to renew his parole, he is seen by Inspector Goitreau who originally arrested him and immediately follows him. As he stops for petrol, some old associates spot him and give him the address of their hideout. Goitreau, suspecting Gino is part of their plans, arrests him and gets the address, but Germain gets him freed.

Thwarted, Goitreau starts harassing Gino, questioning his boss at the printers and his girl friend at the bank.

When the gang pull off a raid, Goitreau knows where they will meet up and arrests them all. He is sure Gino was part of the operation as well and breaks into the flat, where he finds Lucy and starts pushing her about. Gino comes in behind him and, going mad at his girl being assaulted, strangles Goitreau.

He is tried and condemned to death. His lawyer and Germain attend the execution.

Cast
 Jean Gabin - Germain Cazeneuve
 Alain Delon - Gino Strabliggi
 Mimsy Farmer - Lucie
 Victor Lanoux - Marcel
 Cécile Vassort - Évelyne Cazeneuve
 Ilaria Occhini - Sophie Strabliggi
 Guido Alberti - The owner of the printing shop
 Malka Ribowska - The lawyer
 Christine Fabréga - Geneviève Cazeneuve
 Gérard Depardieu - A young gangster
 Robert Castel - André Vaultier
 Bernard Giraudeau - Frédéric Cazeneuve
 Michel Bouquet - Inspector Goitreau

References

External links
 
 
 Two Men in Town at Letterbox DVD

1973 films
1973 crime drama films
Films about capital punishment
French crime drama films
Italian crime drama films
French neo-noir films
Films directed by José Giovanni
Films produced by Alain Delon
Films with screenplays by José Giovanni
Films scored by Philippe Sarde
1970s French films
1970s Italian films